John Black (November 23, 1853 – December 29, 1936) was a lawyer and political figure in New Brunswick, Canada. He represented York County in the Legislative Assembly of New Brunswick from 1895 to 1899 as a Liberal member.

He was born in Kingsclear, New Brunswick, the son of the Reverend John Black and Sarah, the sister of judge Edward Ludlow Wetmore. Black was educated at Fredericton. He studied law and was called to the bar in 1876. Black married a Miss Robb. He served two years on the Fredericton City Council as a councillor and was auditor and secretary-treasurer for York County. He died December 29, 1936 in Fredericton, New Brunswick.

References 

The Canadian parliamentary companion, 1897, JA Gemmill

1856 births
1936 deaths
New Brunswick Liberal Association MLAs
Fredericton city councillors